Sweet Insanity is an unofficial album by American musician Brian Wilson that was produced in 1990 as the follow-up to his first solo album, Brian Wilson (1988). It was largely written and produced by Wilson alongside his former psychologist, Eugene Landy.

The album was rejected by Sire Records due to Landy's lyrics and the inclusion of "Smart Girls", a rap song. Select tracks were later rerecorded for Wilson's 2004 album Gettin' In over My Head.

Background

In 1987, Wilson agreed to a two-album solo contract offered by Sire Records president Seymour Stein. The first album, Brian Wilson, was released in July 1988 to critical acclaim but underwhelming sales, and it was largely overshadowed by the controversies surrounding Wilson's former psychologist, Eugene Landy, who had become his business and creative partner. In August, Rolling Stone reported that Wilson was readying a second album, and that "half" of it had already been written. In May 1989, Wilson recorded "Daddy's Little Girl" for the film She's Out of Control, and in June, was among the featured guests on the charity single "The Spirit of the Forest". That summer, he began producing what became Sweet Insanity.

Style and production
The production of Sweet Insanity retained most of the same personnel as that for Brian Wilson. This time, Landy co-produced the album alongside Wilson, and according to biographer Peter Ames Carlin, there was "no interference of the Sire hotshots who had shepherded Brian's first solo album." Andy Paley, who had co-produced Brian Wilson, said that the second solo effort "was even less real Brian than the first one". He recalled that working on Sweet Insanity was "such an unpleasant experience", although "there were good songs", such as "Rainbow Eyes". Critic Matthew Horton characterized the album's production style as "more bombastic and opulent than the subtler shades of Brian Wilson."

Like Brian Wilson, the record included some guest appearances. The Traveling Wilburys' Bob Dylan and Tom Petty, whose bandmate Jeff Lynne had co-produced a track on Brian Wilson, were featured on "The Spirit of Rock and Roll". Matt Dike, known for his recent hits with hip-hop acts Tone-Loc and Young MC, was asked to co-produce "Smart Girls", a rap song. Dike, who had been a major fan of the Beach Boys' late 1960s era, recalled that Wilson had expected the song to make "millions", to which Dike thought to himself, "What are you, fucking nuts?!"

Brian was the album's initial working title. The renaming to Sweet Insanity was meant to be a toungue-in-cheek reference to Wilson's much-publicized personal issues.  In Wilson's 2016 memoir, I Am Brian Wilson, it explains that "the title was supposed to be a comment about the way that mental illness could turn into something beautiful, but I wasn't sure I wanted a title like that." In a 1993 interview, Mike Love remarked, "to call a record Sweet Insanity, imagine that. A whole album of Brian’s madness that no one wants to release and still everyone says he's a genius!"

Rejection and availability

Two iterations of Sweet Insanity were presented to Sire Records, in 1990 and 1991, and both mixes were rejected due to the inclusion of "Smart Girls" and Landy's lyrics. According to Sire executive Howard Klein, "If [Sweet Insanity] was pathetic, Eugene Landy's lyrics were full of psychological mumbo jumbo. When Wilson brought the tapes in, I thought it was a joke, but it wasn't. It was awful." Sire then agreed to release Wilson from his contract.

Among the original Sweet Insanity tracks, "Country Feeling" was included on the 1991 charity album For Our Children. A limited-release cassette single of "Smart Girls" was also produced. The rest of the album has since been bootlegged, with CD copies of the album distributed by the bootleg labels Vigotone and Invasion Unltd  in 1993.

In 2004, rerecorded and slightly rewritten versions of "Rainbow Eyes", "Make a Wish", and "Don't Let Her Know She's an Angel" were included on Wilson's album Gettin' In over My Head. The album also included rerecordings of "Save the Day" (retitled "Fairy Tale") and "Let's Stick Together" (retitled "The Waltz"), which were not on Sweet Insanity, but dated from the same era. In 2006, a rerecording of "The Spirit of Rock and Roll" was included on a limited-release CD compilation, Songs from Here & Back.

Critical reception

Sweet Insanity was critically panned by those who heard the record at the time. One of the few writers who enjoyed the album was music journalist Bill Holdship, who, in 1991, praised Sweet Insanity as "a wonderful album" and an improvement upon Brian Wilson. Holdship later reported that Wilson's fans were angered by the favorable review and sent Holdship several death threats in response.

In his 2007 book The Greatest Music Never Sold, author Dan Leroy wrote that several of the Sweet Insanity songs suggest that "Wilson's muse was still very much intact and functioning", although "it's fair to say that there is no composition in the Beach Boys' or Brian Wilson's history that has inspired so much enmity as 'Smarts Girls.'" In the 2014 book The Greatest Albums You'll Never Hear, contributor Matthew Horton praised Sweet Insanity for having "plentiful merits", despite some "missteps".

Brett Milano of the Boston Phoenix regarded Sweet Insanity as among Wilson's "best post-'60s albums". AllMusic reviewer Matthew Greenwald wrote, "Most of the record is overbaked both lyrically and musically, with a feeling of sitting in on a therapy session rather than a recording. Some of it is unlistenable, and the mark of Brian Wilson only surfaces rarely. For diehard collectors and the brave of heart."

Track listing
Per Andrew Doe.

See also
The Beach Boys bootleg recordings
Adult/Child

Notes

References

Bibliography

Further reading
 

Brian Wilson albums
Unreleased albums
Sire Records albums
Albums produced by Brian Wilson
Albums produced by Lenny Waronker
Albums produced by Russ Titelman
Albums produced by Jeff Lynne
Bootleg recordings